Reed-Custer High School is a 4-year public high school located at 249 Comet Drive in Braidwood, a southwest suburb of Chicago, Illinois. RCHS is part of the Reed-Custer School District (255U).

Notable alumni
 Kay Cannon, comedy writer and producer, creator of the Pitch Perfect film series
 Brian Dubois, MLB player 
 Les Norman, MLB player

References

Public high schools in Illinois
Schools in Will County, Illinois